Transport in Brunei consists of air, land, and sea transport. Previously there was some rail transport in Brunei, but eventually most of it was closed down.

City buses in Bandar Seri Begawan will be use optically-guided dual-mode buses that are currently in evaluation process.

References

External links

 Land Transport Department, Ministry of Communications
 Ports Department, Ministry of Communications
 Department of Civil Aviation, Ministry of Communications